Himeji Athletic Stadium is an athletic stadium in Himeji, Hyogo, Japan.

External links

Buildings and structures in Himeji
Athletics (track and field) venues in Japan
Football venues in Japan
Sports venues in Hyōgo Prefecture